The Hostile Action Service Medal is awarded by the Central Intelligence Agency for direct exposure to a specific life-threatening incident in the foreign field or in the U.S. where the employee was in close proximity to death or injury, but survived and sustained no injuries. The incident must have occurred during work-related activities or events, which were targeted by armed forces or persons unfriendly to the U.S. Government.

See also 
Awards and decorations of the United States government

References

Awards and decorations of the Central Intelligence Agency